"Country Woman" is a song written and released by British rock band Bee Gees. It was written and performed solely by Maurice Gibb, and released as a B-side of "How Can You Mend a Broken Heart", which was the group's first US No. 1. The songs were released as a double A-side in Germany, France, Japan and Canada.

Recording
The song was recorded at the sessions for the group's album Trafalgar, although unlike How Can You Mend a Broken Heart, it did not make the final cut, instead being relegated to the flip-side of the single. It was recorded on April 6 in IBC on the same day that they finished the songs "God's Good Grace" (unreleased) and "The Greatest Man in the World" (released on the album Trafalgar). Two acoustic guitars played by Maurice and Alan Kendall open the song. Like many of Maurice Gibb's songs written for the group, Barry and Robin Gibb did not contribute to the recording, and Maurice played bass, piano and rhythm guitar as well as handling all the vocals.

Personnel
Maurice Gibb — lead and harmony vocals, acoustic guitar, piano, bass guitar
Alan Kendall — acoustic lead guitar
Geoff Bridgford — drums
Bill Shepherd — orchestral arrangement
Uncredited — horns

References

1971 songs
1971 singles
Bee Gees songs
Songs written by Maurice Gibb
Song recordings produced by Robert Stigwood
Song recordings produced by Barry Gibb
Song recordings produced by Robin Gibb
Song recordings produced by Maurice Gibb